Abundance of Life is a 1950 West German romantic comedy film directed by Wolfgang Liebeneiner and starring Erika Müller, Ingeborg Körner, and Gunnar Möller. It was one of the last of the Rubble films made in the immediate post-war years. It updates a story by Ludwig Tieck to modern-day Hamburg, addressing the shortage of housing in the heavily bombed city.

It was made at the Wandsbek Studios in Hamburg and also shot on location in the city. The film's sets were designed by the art director Mathias Matthies.

Cast

References

External links

1950 romantic comedy films
German romantic comedy films
West German films
Films directed by Wolfgang Liebeneiner
Real Film films
Films shot at Wandsbek Studios
Films set in Hamburg
German black-and-white films
1950s German-language films
1950s German films